The Scania OmniLink is a series of integrally constructed rear longitudinal-engined low-entry city buses available on the European market. It is a complete product built by Scania of Sweden.

The OmniLink was launched in 1998 with an inclined engine and was designated CL94UB, and an articulated version was designated CL94UA. But when the Euro IV version was introduced in 2006, the engine was no longer tilted and the designation changed to CK230UB/CK270UB/CK310UB/CK320UB for the rigid version. The OmniLink's floor raises at the rear section, more like other UK buses, when compared to the flat floored OmniCity.

Initially the bus had only been produced in left-hand drive configurations, however since 2006 right-hand drive versions had been produced and the first three had been delivered to Nottingham City Transport (who were also first to order right-hand drive Scania OmniCitys) in 2007. Nottingham City Transport also trialed 3 ethanol-fuelled OmniLinks, which were used on EcoLink 30, from Nottingham to Wollaton; the trial was not a success, and the buses were later converted back to diesel. 

National Express West Midlands and National Express Dundee were the most significant operator of right-hand drive OmniLinks, purchasing a total of 180 of the type. Fifteen of  these which were initially delivered to the Dundee operation, but were later transferred to the West Midlands. Bus Éireann purchased 25 OmniLinks, while Arriva Midlands purchased nineteen to upgrade fleets in Tamworth and Derby, and Brighton & Hove purchased seven.

Production of the OmniLink ceased in 2013. It was superseded by the Scania Citywide LE for left-hand drive markets and Irizar i3-bodied Scania K UBs for right-hand drive markets.

References

External links 

 Scania OmniLink hybrid bus

OmniLink
Hybrid electric buses
Low-entry buses
Articulated buses
Tri-axle buses
Vehicles introduced in 1998